Yarijan-e Sofla (also Romanized as Yārījān-e Soflá; also known as Yārījān-e Pā’īn and Yārīkhān-e Soflá) is a village in Jalalvand Rural District, Firuzabad District, Kermanshah County, Kermanshah Province, Iran. At the 2006 census, its population was 39, in 6 families.

References 

Populated places in Kermanshah County